Punch is a New Zealand drama film written and directed by Welby Ings and starring Tim Roth. It is Ings' feature directorial debut.

Cast
Tim Roth as Stan
Jordan Oosterhof as Jim
Conan Hayes as Whetu
Abigail Laurent as Chelsea
Connor Johnston
Sage Klein as Amber
Wilson Downes as Riley

Production
Production on the film commenced in Auckland, New Zealand in November 2020.  In July 2021, it was announced that production on the film wrapped.

Release
The film premiered at the 2022 New Zealand International Film Festival.

Reception
The film has a 69% rating on Rotten Tomatoes based on 13 reviews.

References

External links
 

2020s English-language films
2020s New Zealand films
New Zealand drama films
Films shot in New Zealand
New Zealand LGBT-related films